Philip Chatfield (2 December 1927 – 25 July 2021) was a British born ballet dancer, choreographer and artistic director. He danced for the Royal Ballet and was artistic director of the Royal New Zealand Ballet.

Early life 
Chatfield was born in 1927 near Southampton, England, starting ballet at the age of six. He took up a scholarship to the Sadler's Wells Ballet School at the age of 11.

Career 

Chatfield became a full-time member at Sadler's Wells (later the Royal Ballet) at the age of 15 in 1943. He became a principal dancer in 1955. He performed leading and solo roles.

In 1958–1959 Chatfield toured in Europe, America, New Zealand and Australia with his ballet dancer wife, New Zealander Rowena Jackson. In 1959 Chatfield and Jackson retired from performing and left London to settle in New Zealand. That year, with other dancers such as Russell Kerr and Poul Gnatt, they formed the United Ballet Company which toured New Zealand. In the mid–1970s Chatfield became director of the National School of Ballet, with Jackson as associate director. From 1975–1978 Chatfield was artistic director of the Royal New Zealand Ballet. In 1993 Chatfield and Jackson moved to live near family in Brisbane.

Personal life 
Chatfield married Rowena Jackson in 1958. They had one son and one daughter.

He died in Brisbane on 25 July 2021.

References

External links 
 Philip Chatfield at the reunion of the directors of the New Zealand Ballet in 1984 in Te Ara
Tribute to Philip Chatfield, Royal New Zealand Ballet, 2021
Remembering Philip Chatfield (1927–2021), Royal Opera House, 26 July 2021

1927 births
2021 deaths
People educated at the Royal Ballet School
New Zealand male ballet dancers
British male ballet dancers
20th-century New Zealand dancers
20th-century ballet dancers
British emigrants to New Zealand